The 2007–08 KFC Cup was the 34th edition of the Regional Super50, the domestic limited-overs cricket competition for the countries of the West Indies Cricket Board (WICB). The competition was played between 16 and 28 October 2007, with the group stage hosted by Guyana and the play-offs hosted by Barbados.

Eight teams contested the competition – the six regular teams of West Indian domestic cricket (Barbados, Guyana, Jamaica, the Leeward Islands, Trinidad and Tobago, and the Windward Islands), and two development teams (Combined Campuses and Colleges and the West Indies under-19 side). The Combined Campuses were competing for the first team. Jamaica eventually defeated Trinidad and Tobago in the final by 28 runs, winning their seventh domestic one-day title. Earlier in the tournament, the West Indies under-19s had been bowled out for 18 by Barbados, setting a new record for the lowest total in a List A match.

Squads

Group stage

Zone A

Zone B

Finals

Semi-finals

Final

Statistics

Most runs
The top five run scorers (total runs) are included in this table.

Source: CricketArchive

Most wickets

The top five wicket takers are listed in this table, listed by wickets taken and then by bowling average.

Source: CricketArchive

References

2007 in West Indian cricket
Regional Super50 seasons
Domestic cricket competitions in 2007–08